Enevold is a given name. Notable people with the given name include:

Enevold Brandt (1738–1772), Danish courtier
Enevold De Falsen (1755–1808), Danish-Norwegian lawyer, poet, actor and statesman
Enevold Steenblock Høyum (1775–1830), Norwegian military officer and politician
Enevold Kruse (1554–1621), Danish nobleman
Enevold Sørensen (1850–1920), Danish editor and politician
Enevold Thømt (1878–1958), Norwegian painter